The Embattled Hearts is the title of Veal's third album. The album was released in 2003 in Canada. It was the first reintroduction of lead singer Luke Doucet into the band since his comparatively more successful solo career.

Reviews And Reception 
The album was welcomed by Sean Carruthers, who described the sounds of the album as " Turning it into a rocking, sludgy rockabilly number". He feels the reintroduction of Luke has had an significant impact on the ambiance and style of music in the album.

Track listing 
"Defiler"
"Everybody Wants More Cocaine"
"Girlfriend (Parts II & III)"
"Radio"
"Judy Garland"
"Mitzi's"
"I Hate Your Lipstick"
"Circles"
"Toothbrush"
"Miss Brazil"
"Cowboy"
"Fader Creep"

References

2003 albums
Veal (band) albums
Six Shooter Records albums